Division No. 6 (Virden) is a census division located within the Westman Region of south west Manitoba, located in the unceded territory of the Dakota people in Treaty 2. Unlike in some other provinces, census divisions do not reflect the organization of local government in Manitoba. These areas exist solely for the purposes of statistical analysis and presentation; they have no government of their own. 

Note that the Dakota have never signed a treaty in Canada. The major service centre for the area is the Town of Virden. The area population as of 2001 was 10,110. The economy of the area is mixed farming, livestock and crude oil production. Also included in the division are the Canupawakpa Dakota First Nation and the Sioux Valley First Nation.

Demographics 

Towns

 Virden

Unincorporated communities

 Elkhorn
 Oak Lake

Rural municipalities

Pipestone
Sifton
Wallace – Woodworth

First Nations

 Canupawakpa Dakota First Nation
 Sioux Valley Dakota Nation

References

Community Profile: Census Division No. 6, Manitoba; Statistics Canada

External links
 Manitoba Regional Profiles: Westman Region 

06